Boophis boehmei is a species of frog in the family Mantellidae.
It is endemic to Madagascar.
Its natural habitats are subtropical or tropical moist lowland forests, subtropical or tropical moist montane forests, and rivers.
It is threatened by habitat loss.

References
 Nussbaum, R., Vallan, D. & Vences, M. 2004.  Boophis boehmei.   2006 IUCN Red List of Threatened Species.   Downloaded on 23 July 2007.

boehmei
Endemic frogs of Madagascar
Amphibians described in 1992
Taxonomy articles created by Polbot